Antonio Di Nunno (5 August 1945 – 3 January 2015) was an Italian politician and journalist. He served as mayor of Avellino as a member of the Italian People's Party from May 1995 to October 2003. Antonio considered the usefulness of political commitment in his city.

Biography
Antonio Di Nunno was born in Avellino, Campania on 5 August 1945 and died in Avellino, Campania at the age of 69. He died as a result of an illness that had affected him irreparably fifteen years before his death in January 2015. He was a professional journalist of RAI Tgr Campania.

See also
 List of mayors of Avellino

References 

1945 births
2015 deaths
People from Avellino
Italian People's Party (1994) politicians
20th-century Italian politicians
21st-century Italian politicians
Mayors of Avellino